Mohinder Suresh is a fictional character on the NBC drama Heroes, portrayed by Sendhil Ramamurthy. He is from Chennai, Tamil Nadu, India and is a genetics professor at the University of Madras holding a PhD in parapsychology. Mohinder is attempting to find the truth behind the sudden death of his father, Chandra Suresh (portrayed by Erick Avari), and to continue his father's research of finding 'superhuman' beings on Earth. In character, Suresh also provides many episodes with opening and/or closing dialogue, generally philosophical musings regarding the events that take place during the episode.  

Some fans think he was named for Mohinder Amarnath Bhardwaj, a former Indian cricketer, current cricket analyst and actor. 

The role of Mohinder was originally written to be a 55-year-old geneticist looking for super-powered humans.  However, Sendhil Ramamurthy's audition was so convincing that the main character part was rewritten to be a younger geneticist following in his father's footsteps.  The concept of the older geneticist was spun off into the minor, yet central, character of Chandra Suresh.

Character history

Genesis 
After hearing news of his father's death in New York, Mohinder suspects that his father was murdered to silence the findings of his genetics research.

Mohinder travels to Brooklyn, where he rents his father's other apartment. Although it is in disarray, much of the material is still there and Mohinder begins to reorganize it. To makes ends meet during his lengthy stay, Mohinder takes a job as a taxi driver and picks up a passenger named Peter Petrelli, who asks him about "being special." Although Mohinder is slow to realize what Peter means, he eventually talks to him about genetics and evolution. Afterward, Mohinder gets another passenger, Mr. Bennet. Bennet acts ordinary enough at first, talking about himself, and heading home after business. However, he begins to ask Mohinder personal questions, referencing personal details such as his teaching position in India. Being startled (likely fearing he is about to be murdered in the same manner as his father,) Mohinder abandons the cab and runs away.

In the second episode, Mohinder discovers that his father had compiled a program to find the "special people."

Mohinder finds a man in his father's apartment. The man claims he is an exterminator, but Mohinder quickly realizes that the man was planting an eavesdropping device. The man pulls a gun, but after a struggle that leads out into the apartment hallway, a girl picks up the gun asking, "If you're the exterminator, why do you have a gun holster?", prompting the man to quickly leave. The girl, Eden McCain, introduces herself as a friend of Mohinder's father and expresses enthusiasm about his theories on genetics.

Mohinder and Eden discover a portable hard drive in his father's pet's cage. The hard drive appears to have all the genetic research that his father had done on tracking those with special abilities.

Mohinder also learns that his father seems to have had a falling out with a man named Sylar. Chandra thought Sylar was "Patient Zero", according to Eden, but on a recorded telephone message, Chandra seems to want nothing to do with the strange man.

Mohinder, jumping at every noise, fears for his life and keeps a pistol cocked and ready. Fortunately, no bad people are breaking in; it's only Eden. She brings him macaroni and cheese, and they discuss his father's work. Mohinder recalls that his father never answered a question directly, but answered with another question.  Frustrated, he throws his father's laptop. However, by throwing it, he accidentally reveals a small book hidden in a compartment. As they thumb through the leather notebook, they discover a list of names, apparently of people all across the globe that possess "abilities." The name "Sylar" pops up and scrawled there is his New York address. They also find a key in the book.

They make their way to his apartment. They knock, but there's no answer. Mohinder produces the key that they found, but it doesn't fit. Therefore, he pulls out a screwdriver and picks the lock. They enter a very neat kitchen, with a teacup resting on the table. Mohinder takes pictures. As they go further into the apartment, they find that the walls are covered with bookshelves packed with books—all impeccably ordered. Eden notices an anatomy book laying open to a page where the face is dissected. Mohinder bumps a closet door, and what he finds is astonishing: a room lit by a string of light bulbs and a map identical to his father's, but with more pins stuck in and yarn links. However, going further in, he finds a more astounding sight. Painted up in red letters are the words "Forgive Me." In smaller letters, all over the rough cement wall are written, "I have sinned", over and over. When they return to the apartment with the police, however, the apartment has been cleaned out, with no evidence to support Mohinder's claims.

Mohinder tracks down Nathan Petrelli to question him about whether he might be one of the "special people" his father was researching.  Nathan, who is busy running in a congressional election, does not listen to Mohinder, but tells Peter about him. Peter then makes the connection to Mohinder and his father's book and visits Mohinder's apartment. Because Peter cannot demonstrate any powers without another "special person" being there for him to mimic, they set out to visit Isaac, who Peter says can paint the future.  Unfortunately, Isaac is strung out on heroin and refuses to open the door.

On the subway ride back, time suddenly freezes for everyone but Peter, who meets a future version of Hiro.  When time unfreezes in "Hiros", Peter tells Mohinder about the encounter, but Mohinder is now convinced that Peter is crazy.  Mohinder makes a decision: he will return to Madras with his father's ashes. Peter tries to convince him otherwise but to no avail.

After returning to his apartment in "Better Halves", Mohinder picks up and prepares to leave. Eden wants him to stay, flirting with and even kissing him before he goes. Though Mohinder feels certain of his choice, Eden says she's sure he'll be back.

In "Seven Minutes to Midnight", Mohinder returns to India to scatter his father's ashes. He debates whether to return to his job as a college professor. His ex-girlfriend Mira invites him to interview for a job at a company doing genetics research where she has just been made a department head. However, she says he must not mention his father's research into the evolution of superpowers or consider continuing it.  Mohinder talks with his mother about her decision to let his father go to the United States to look for people with superhuman abilities. She tells him for the first time about his sister, Shanti, who died when she was five and Mohinder was two, which is also mentioned in The Hard Part, in which he tells Molly that he was born a few months too late to save his sister. Shanti was "special", according to her mother, and their father loved her so much that he was afraid Mohinder would find his love for his son wanting in comparison.  Mohinder also has a series of prophetic dreams, depicting a young Indian boy who guides him to various scenes showing his parents arguing and showing his father's murder. Mohinder later finds a file with a photo of the boy, named Sanjog Iyer, in his father's office.

In the episode "Homecoming", Mohinder locates Sanjog playing soccer, and questions him about his visions. The young boy tells Mohinder that troubled people seek him out in their dreams, not the other way around. Sanjog also tells Mohinder that he already has the answers he seeks. Mohinder then decides to continue his father's research and accesses his father's computer files, using the password "Shanti". The files contain the names of all of the people with superpowers that Chandra Suresh had located. Mohinder tells his mother that he plans to return to New York, and that he wants to seek out people with special powers to tell them of their abilities.

Upon returning to New York, Mohinder began preparations to warn the people on Chandra Suresh's list of Sylar, as a number of those on the list had already been killed by the telekinetic serial killer. Shortly after, he received a phone call from Eden. Without going into details, she explained to him that she wasn't who he thought she was.  She said that she was going to explain further after she "made things right" by killing Sylar, who she knew killed Chandra Suresh. Eden then hung up on Mohinder.

Two weeks later in "Godsend", Mohinder learns of Eden's suicide. An officer comes by to talk with Eden's former neighbors. He asks Mohinder if he knew a woman named Sarah Ellis, to which he replies that she was on the list, he had tried unsuccessfully to locate her in LA, and had never met her before.  The officer then shows him a picture of a woman identified as Sarah Ellis and Mohinder tells him that he knew her by a different name: Eden McCain. The officer then tells him that she was found in Lake Ramsey, having suffered a single gunshot wound to the head.

Later, Mr. Bennet appears at the apartment. When Mohinder confronts him about Eden and her death, he tells Mohinder that Eden was a good person. Bennet wants Mohinder's help in finding people with abilities and "making a difference." When Mohinder refuses, Bennet asks if Mohinder is on the list, a question he sidesteps with no answer. Mohinder says he isn't interested in helping Bennet, but Bennet leaves his card anyway.

Nathan Petrelli approaches Mohinder in "The Fix." Mohinder quickly apologizes for coming off as "a raving lunatic" when they first met. Nathan has come to Mohinder in an attempt to help his brother, Peter Petrelli. They begin talking, and Nathan explains that Peter is afraid of causing an explosion. Mohinder, in turn, explains Peter's unique, "sponge"-like superpowers to Nathan. Mohinder also states that he may be able to help with Peter's condition if he is able to test Peter. However, Nathan is reluctant to let Mohinder come into contact with Peter, fearing that Mohinder will "feed into [Peter's] paranoia." Still, Mohinder insists, and they leave to find Peter. When they find Peter at his apartment, he "has no time to be [Mohinder's] guinea pig" and was now the one refusing an imploring Mohinder's pleas. Instead, Peter briefly pretends to agree with the two before Claude appears and helps Peter escape. Recently, Mohinder has called many of those found on his father's list. To his discouragement, no one believed him until he received a return call from Zane Taylor. He went to meet with Zane and get a DNA sample, but, unknown to him, encountered Sylar at Zane's residence. Sylar, posing as Zane, teamed up with Mohinder, claiming that he could help with Mohinder's work.

Mohinder, who has known for some time that Sylar was posing as Zane, drugs him when they return to Mohinder's apartment. He straps Sylar to a chair and hooks him up to an I.V., filled with curare, a liquid that prevents Sylar from using his powers. Mohinder almost shoots Sylar, but Sylar persuades him not to do it. Mohinder realizes that he needs Sylar alive for a few more minutes so he can continue his research. After he is done, Mohinder tries to shoot Sylar in the head, but Sylar stops the bullet in mid-air using telekinesis. He breaks free and tells Mohinder that he had stopped the I.V. long ago, and that Mohinder did not notice because he was so involved in his research. At the end of the episode "Parasite", Peter finds a bloodied Mohinder pinned to the ceiling. Mohinder is just barely able to reveal that Sylar is standing behind Peter before Peter is attacked.

As Peter and Sylar fight, Mohinder is released from the ceiling. He manages to ram the map into Sylar, knocking him out and taking out the body of Peter but not before taking the List as well. He later takes the body to the Petrelli's mansion. Later on, Thompson arrives at Mohinder's apartment to convince him to work with Primatech, offering him vast resources to do research but Mohinder is more concerned with stopping Sylar. Thompson says they both have the same interests and asks him to join forces. At first, Mohinder declines the offer, insisting that anything that happens should be under his ground, because he had the List. Then Thompson tells him of Molly Walker and her sickness and power. Mohinder goes immediately to see her. Mohinder learns that she can stop Sylar by tracking him, but needs to cure her sickness of nerve deterioration. Mohinder discovers that his sister, Shanti, had the same illness and died of it, and that his father had found a cure for it without telling anyone. Mohinder researches and discovers that by giving Molly his own functioning antibodies, it will restore her humoral immune response.

Later, Noah Bennet and Matt Parkman come into the building. Molly tells Mohinder that Matt is there. Through the surveillance camera, they see Mr. Bennet and Parkman approaching the room. Bennet wants to kill Molly to protect Claire, but Mohinder will not let him and holds a gun to Bennet, who is holding a gun to Molly. Matt Parkman ceases the potential gunfire and Mohinder escapes the building with Molly, Micah Sanders, Niki Sanders, and D.L. Hawkins.

Generations 

Four months after the incident in New York, Mohinder has been giving speeches about superhumans and a fatal virus that affects only these special beings. At one of his speeches in Cairo, Egypt, he is approached by a mysterious man named Bob (who can turn objects into gold), who offers him a job at The Company. Mohinder accepts the offer; he and Noah Bennet are planning to take down The Company from the inside, and his speeches had just been bait.

In Lizards, Mohinder is assigned to find the Haitian by the Company.  He travels to Port-au-Prince in Haiti where he finds the Haitian and cures him of the Shanti virus. Mohinder later tells the Haitian to meet with Noah Bennet, to join the crusade to take down the Company.  After his trip to Haiti, Mohinder returns to his apartments, where he and Matt Parkman have become adoptive fathers to Molly Walker. Mohinder informs Parkman that he will be working in New York for a while trying to take down the Company.  Parkman doesn't agree with Mohinder's plans.  Mohinder is then taken to Isaac Mendez loft, where the Company has transformed the loft into a laboratory for Mohinder.  Mohinder searches through the loft and finds the eighth painting in Isaac Mendez series of 8, that foretells the apparent death of Noah Bennet.

In "The Kindness of Strangers", Parkman finds a picture of the Original 12, one of which was his father.  He asks Molly Walker to find him using her ability, but Molly is reluctant and afraid to find Parkman's father, because he is the nightmare man in Molly's dream.  Mohinder doesn't support Matt, but Molly agrees with terrible results.  Molly is able to find Parkmans father, Maury, but this leaves Molly in a dream induced coma. Mohinder, with apprehension from Noah Bennet, takes Molly to the Company for help, not knowing what else to do. While discussing Molly with Bob at the Company, Mohinder is issued a stun gun and new assignment.  While addressing the details of the assignment, Niki Sanders enters the room and attacks Bob.  Mohinder is able to stop her with the stun gun, which he initially did not want to use.  Mohinder later is seen next to Niki, who has been strapped to a bed in the Company facility.  Mohinder, once Bob leaves the room, attempts to free Niki, however, she doesn't want to leave, believing that the Company will help her.

Mohinder makes his way to New Orleans and begins to do research on a new hero named Monica Dawson.  Bob is initially impressed with Monica, as she has an ability that the Company has not seen before. Moral issues begin to arise with Mohinder as he is asked to inject a modified version of the Shanti virus to Monica, in the hopes that this modified version would strip Monica of her powers without killing her, as the normal Shanti Virus does.  Mohinder doesn't want to use Monica as a lab rat, and tries to find comfort in calling Bennet, with no success. Mohinder's morality causes him not to inject the virus into Monica and go against Bob.  Bob initially accepts Mohinder's stand on the issue and tells Mohinder he will be issued a partner to help keep everyone in line.  The partner ends up being a more healthy-looking Niki.  Bob reveals to Mohinder that they are experimenting with the virus in order to stop a man named Adam Monroe, who is killing original members of the Company.

After Noah Bennet confronts Mohinder about the painting depicting him with a Company-issue gun and a broken nose, Mohinder explains that he hasn't been given one. His nose is also fine. When Maury Parkman attacks the Company and corrupts Niki Sanders, however, his nose is broken by her. After she injects herself with the modified virus, which Mohinder cannot cure, Bob suggests tracking down Claire Bennet, whose ability might be able to produce a viable cure. He is then given the gun seen in the photo by Bob. He betrays Noah to Bob; his priorities having changed with the introduction of the incurable virus.

Another picture Bennet finds depicting the future reveals Bennet lying dead on the ground, with his daughter crying in the background.  Mohinder distracted Bennet while Bob went to capture Claire and extract her blood (as a cure for the mutated Shanti virus). Bennet almost killed Mohinder when Elle ambushed them, but did not; however, Mohinder's trust in Bennet was broken completely, and he assumed that Bennet would go to any lengths to protect his daughter, no matter who would be harmed or killed.  After kidnapping Bob's daughter, Elle, Bennet brokers a trade for his own captured daughter.  However, as the two girls are switched, Elle breaks free and tries to kill Claire and her boyfriend, West.  Bennet shoots Elle in the arm, then prepares to kill Bob.  He says that Bob is the heart of the Company, and if Bob is dead, then the Company dies with him.  As Bennet prepares to fire, Mohinder shoots him in the left eye - exactly as in the painting.

In "Truth & Consequences", Mohinder revives Bennet using Claire's blood, explaining that such acts are what the Company does. He leaves Bennet locked in a holding cell. Using Claire's blood to reinforce the antibodies in his blood, he then derives a cure for the new strain of the virus and prepares to leave for New Orleans to deliver it to Niki Sanders. However, while making his way to the airport, Sylar calls and tells him that he has Molly Walker.

In "Powerless" he returns to his loft in Brooklyn to find Sylar and Maya Herrera with a sleeping Molly Walker. Sylar forces Mohinder to help heal his strain of virus that is preventing him from using his powers. Mohinder takes Sylar and the others to Isaac Mendez's loft.  After Maya is shot by Sylar, Mohinder proves to Sylar that he can cure the virus by bringing Maya back from the dead using the blood he took from Claire.  However, as Mohinder is about to inject Sylar with a transfusion of blood, Elle Bishop intercedes. Elle shocks Sylar in the back, but he manages to escape, taking the last transfusion of blood with him.  Mohinder thanks Elle for saving them, saying that Sylar "would have slaughtered us all had you not been here."

Villains 

In the third season, Mohinder is able to isolate the source of powers (located in the adrenal glands) from Maya and injects himself with a formula he creates based on that. The formula imbues him with increased strength, agility, balance, athletic ability, and heightened senses. However, because the formula is incomplete, as revealed in "I Am Become Death", his body begins to mutate, developing bug-like attributes which begin with lesions on his back and shoulders. His fingers also begin to secrete a sticky, web-like substance. These mutations were, according to writers/producers Joe Pokaski and Aron Coliete, inspired by The Fly, a film in which a scientist's DNA is spliced with that of a fly, resulting in his eventual transformation into a giant fly.

Mohinder finds that he is unable to develop a cure for either his condition or Maya's power, though he lies about it to Maya. Unable to control his aggression, he breaks up a fight with a neighboring couple and brutally beats the man's head against the wall. When the man comes looking for payback later on, Mohinder overpowers him and pulls him into the lab, encasing him in a cocoon made from the substance his fingers secrete. He does the same to several others, going so far as to kidnap a drug dealer from a park and drag his body back to his loft. When Maya discovers this and calls him a monster, he cocoons her as well.

When Mohinder learns that Nathan Petrelli and Tracy Strauss were artificially given abilities, he detains them in an effort to cure himself. While the couple is unconscious, he has an encounter with Daphne Millbrook, who invites him to join Pinehearst. She leaves abruptly after discovering all the victims hidden in the back of his lab. Once Tracy comes to her senses, she manages to free herself and Nathan. Mohinder decides against fighting them, instead grabbing Maya and fleeing to Pinehearst. Arthur removes her ability at his request, but her faith in him is already shattered. He admits to having genuine feelings for Maya.

In order to cure himself, Mohinder begins working with the formula stolen by Daphne. Peter's description of Mohinder's future self only strengthens his resolve to perfect the formula. He also discovers that many of the abilities he has documented first manifested during the solar eclipse nearly a year ago, although he initially believes this to be a mere coincidence until the next solar eclipse removes his powers. Upon returning him to normal, Mohinder's tries to visit Maya, but the eclipse ends before he can speak with her, so he doesn't go through with it. His research hits a wall when it is revealed that the formula needs a special catalyst (which can't be artificially produced) to grant abilities without inducing violent mutation. Arthur obtains this catalyst and finishes the formula before his death. Mohinder tests it on a soldier named Scott, who is granted super-strength.

In "Dual", Mohinder tries to take the formula to stop his progressing mutations. He is thwarted by a combination of Daphne stealing the vial in his hand and Peter, Flint, and Knox destroying his lab at Pinehearst. In the process, however, they knock over a large vat of the formula, which Mohinder is exposed to, causing the lesions from the first flawed formula to disappear. The highly-flammable formula is then ignited by Flint, blowing up the lab. Mohinder survives, apparently suffering only minor injuries, and is picked up on the road by Tracy Strauss.

Fugitives
In "A Clear and Present Danger" Mohinder is ambushed by Nathan's agents. While trying to escape capture, Mohinder is seemingly rescued by Noah Bennet. After Noah asks him a series of questions, Noah's true alliance is revealed when he surrenders Mohinder to Nathan's agents. Later, Mohinder is drugged and put on a plane with other people with abilities. He is awakened by Claire and holds on to Peter after he accidentally freezes a hole into the plane.

In "Trust and Blood", after the plane crashes, he and Matt save Hiro from being recaptured by soldiers. The three of them run and stop at a trailer when Matt starts drawing pictures of the future. While Matt is drawing, Mohinder suggests to Hiro that he surrender himself and tells Nathan and his men that he is now powerless so that he can live a normal life. Mohinder and Hiro run after Matt, after he realizes that Daphne is in danger and heads back to the crash site. When Daphne is killed and Claire uses herself as a shield after being discovered by Nathan's soldiers, Mohinder, Hiro, Matt, and Ando escape and meet up with Peter.

As is seen in the end of "Building 26" and continued in "Cold Wars", Mohinder, along with Peter and Matt, drug and kidnap Noah. It is then revealed, though Matt reading Noah's memories, that Noah warned Mohinder about the government program. Mohinder claims that he didn't believe Noah. A fight with Matt ensues. In order to allow Matt time to verify Noah's claim that Daphne is still alive, Mohinder goes out to fight the approaching government agents. He is then captured, and Nathan tells him that if he doesn't help him find a "cure" for abilities, he'd let Daphne die.

Later, in "Cold Snap" Tracy escapes with the help of 'Rebel' and "rescues" Mohinder, Matt, and Daphne. Mohinder and Matt take Daphne to the hospital for treatment. He is there to comfort Matt when Daphne passes away.

In "Turn and Face the Strange", after Daphne's death, Mohinder tries to convince Matt not to take revenge on Danko, but ultimately fails. Mohinder then returns to his apartment to collect some of his possessions, but learns that everything has been confiscated by Danko and his men except some papers that belonged to his father. From these papers Mohinder learns about "Coyote Sands" and eventually goes there to learn what his father did there.

In "1961" he is at "Coyote Sands" where he knocks down Noah during the sandstorm and takes him to a cabin fearing that HLS was on his tail; Noah then informs him about the fate of the relocation center. After searching through the debris, he learns that his father worked on evolved humans, including some of the founding members of the Company, there from Angela Petrelli. When Angela goes missing, he helps in the search for her. Later, Peter and Mohinder find Angela and protect her from her sister, Alice; she mistakes Mohinder with his father and sends a bolt of lightning at him. After Alice flees, Peter hands him a film labeled as Project Icarus, involving both Chandra Suresh and Zimmerman, which he expects will help Mohinder find the truth about his father. When everyone is about to leave, Mohinder tells Peter that he can't come because he still hasn't forgiven himself and stays alone in "Coyote Sands".

At the end of "I Am Sylar" he is seen analyzing the film frame by frame, to later being cornered by Danko's agents; Mohinder is tranquilized and abducted by them.

In "An Invisible Thread", Mohinder is rescued from Building 26 along with the rest of the evolved humans by Hiro and Ando and at their insistence examines Hiro to determine why his powers are causing him headaches and nosebleeds.  Mohinder determines that Hiro's body is rejecting his powers and he can't risk stopping time anymore.  After Hiro does to save Noah and passes out, Mohinder takes care of him and plans to take him to the hospital.  Later, Mohinder witnesses the burning of what is supposed to be Sylar's body.

Redemption
Other than a few brief mentions by other characters (including Peter revealing he replicated Mohinder's power in order to be stronger so he could save more lives), Mohinder was absent until the episode "Once Upon a Time in Texas", where it was revealed that he was presumably killed during an event Samuel was involved in, eight weeks prior. Samuel enlists the help of Hiro to undo what he refers to as a mistake.

In "Brother's Keeper", Mohinder is shown to be living with Mira in Madras and working as a professor, but his father's files and films about Project Icarus lure him once more into his research, driving Mira away. Mohinder builds a compass and follows it to the "Sullivan Bros. Carnival", where he meets Joseph, and discusses with him about Samuel's power, unknowing he was eavesdropping them. After understanding the danger Samuel would become, he decides to burn the film and return to India, but Samuel finds him and tries to make him speak, finally killing him in his motel room. Hiro fixes Samuel's mistake by saving the film, but also saves Mohinder's life, thus changing the timeline. Hiro then teleports Mohinder away and hides him under a false name in a mental hospital in Florida in order to keep him out of sight for eight weeks since Mohinder refused to disappear. As of now, Samuel still believes that Mohinder is dead.

In "Close to You", a brain-addled Hiro and Ando launch a rescue mission for him.  Ando switches his daily pills with aspirin (accidentally swallowing Mohinder's pills at the same time) and it allows him to break free of his straitjacket and cell easily with his powers.  Mohinder is happy, confused and angry to see Hiro, as Hiro trapped him there in the first place, but joins him in wheeling the drugged Ando out of the hospital.  The group gets cornered by orderlies, but a recovering Ando blasts open a door, creating enough of a distraction for Mohinder to overpower the orderlies and allow them to escape.  Outside, the group is chased through a swamp by dogs and orderlies and Mohinder, knowing they'll never outrun them, wants Hiro to teleport them away.  Hiro, in his addled state isn't able to and Mohinder suggests Ando use his power like electro-shock therapy in an attempt to restore Hiro's mind.  Ando, though reluctant, tries and it works, restoring Hiro who immediately teleports them to safety, getting them away just before the orderlies and dogs find their hiding place.  Hiro teleports them to Noah Bennet's apartment, interrupting Noah and Lauren Gilmore kissing and Hiro asks for Noah and Lauren to help the three.

In "Pass/Fail", Mohinder helps Noah building a new compass to lead him to Samuel, stating only an evolved human can activate it, suggesting Noah to use Ando. He then leaves to India.

In the graphic novel "Second Chances", Mohinder has returned to India back to Mira, but he found a messy apartment, understanding she is in trouble. He then asks the help of Molly, who found Mira being held hostage by a man interested in Mohinder's research. Mohinder rushes into the rescue, taking everyone down with his enhanced strength, and saving Mira. They then kiss.

Heroes Reborn
After gathering thousands of people for the Odessa Peace Summit on June 13, 2014, the Summit is bombed, and Mohinder is branded a terrorist.

In "June 13 - Part 1", Mohinder meets Angela Petrelli shortly before the Summit and it is revealed that he has been working in the Arctic and has uncovered proof of a coming extinction-level event, something they refer to as the Healing. Angela has had visions of it as well and informs Mohinder that Erica Kravid, who is funding Mohinder's research, is planning to only save those she cares about and has destroyed his research and killed his team. While Mohinder plans to reveal the truth at the Summit, Angela warns him that Erica will preempt his efforts and kill him. Mohinder refuses to believe Angela due to her past actions, but grows worried after he can't reach his team. To this end, he leaves a copy of his research with Molly Walker in case something happens to him. As Angela warned him, Erica does stop his speech and has Harris tranquilize and take him to the stadium garage to kill him. Harris blocks Mohinder's powers with a drug similar to the Building 26 drug, but Mohinder is rescued by a future Hiro Nakamura. Spotting three more Harris' with bomb vests, Mohinder chases one while Hiro takes on two. Mohinder catches up to Harris, but the cloud of darkness released by Phoebe Frady drains his power and Harris is able to break free. He then reveals he is near a load-bearing wall and he and his other clones will use the bombs to destroy the Summit and kill everyone there. Mohinder is horrified as Harris informs him that he will change the world, just not as he expected. A short time later, Harris' bombing destroys the Summit, leaving Mohinder's fate unclear.

In "June 13 - Part 2", the real Mohinder is revealed to have apparently died in the bombing while Erica Kravid uses a shapeshifter to record a video by "Mohinder" stating that he did the bombing for evo supremacy. Erica also blames the murders of Mohinder's team on Mohinder himself. Molly later has Nathan teleport her to India so she can tell Mohinder's mother the truth about his death.

In "Send in the Clones", Micah broadcasts a video to the world showing a shapeshifter being coached by Erica in making the video, exposing Erica's lies and clearing Mohinder's name.

Powers and abilities 

In the first two seasons, Mohinder is an ordinary human with no abilities. However, after he injects himself with a faulty formula derived from Maya's adrenaline, Mohinder gains Spider-Man-like powers. These include heightened senses, enhanced strength, wallcrawling, and the ability to jump extremely high. As a side effect of using an incorrect formula, he becomes increasingly aggressive and erratic in behavior, begins to biologically generate a substance that is similar to a spider's web, and develops scales on his skin. The infection eventually spreads throughout his body. After being exposed to the perfected formula, the side effects disappear, leaving him with only the increased strength, agility and reflexes. In "A Clear and Present Danger", with his increased strength Mohinder was shown to be strong enough to rip the door off a car.  When Peter replicated his power to help him as a paramedic, he demonstrated that Mohinder's other abilities come with enhanced agility and reflexes as well ("Orientation").

In addition, Mohinder was born with unique antibodies that can counteract the Shanti Virus, curing the disease it causes to evolved humans, returning their abilities as well ("The Hard Part"). More evolved strains of this virus require the addition of Claire's regenerative blood to enhance the effect of Mohinder's antibodies ("Out of Time").

Alternate timelines

 In the alternate future of "Five Years Gone", in which New York City is destroyed by a nuclear explosion, Mohinder is working as Chief Medical Advisor to Nathan Petrelli, who has been elected President of the United States and is actually Sylar impersonating Petrelli.  The world has grown fearful of those with special abilities due to "Nathan" blaming the explosion on Sylar to protect his brother Peter, who was the true cause of the bomb.  As President, Sylar devises a plan to gradually and systematically eliminate them. He has been using Mohinder's knowledge of their genetic makeup to create a serum which he declares will reverse these genetic anomalies, but in all actuality destroys them (a development which Mohinder staunchly opposes). Though "Nathan" orders Mohinder to kill present-Hiro, Mohinder instead assists Hiro and frees him from the Haitian (who, with Parkman, had captured Hiro) by stabbing the Haitian with the syringe containing the toxic serum, thus killing him. He then helps buy Hiro and Ando time to escape by holding the door of the room closed while Peter and Sylar fight it out in the corridor outside.
 In the alternate future of "I Am Become Death", in which artificial superpowers are publicly available, present-day Peter visits Mohinder's lab in order to question him about Sylar (who has long since reassumed his identity of Gabriel Gray). Though Mohinder still occupies the lab, it is trashed and covered in spider webs. Mohinder has apparently mutated into something barely human and shows a strong aversion to light. He wears heavy clothing that obscures all but his hands and stays in the shadows, so his face is not revealed. His hands are covered in sores/scales and his voice is distorted significantly. His stance and movement are also much less human. He tells Peter that when he injected himself with the power, he had the formula "terribly wrong". He refuses to tell Peter where Sylar is, but Peter reads his mind to find out.
 In the original timeline of Redemption, Mohinder was murdered by Samuel Sullivan eight weeks before "Once Upon a Time in Texas" and "Brother's Keeper". He also burned a film from the Coyote Sands Relocation Center, which Samuel Sullivan desperately wanted. Hiro time traveled from the present and retrieved the film, switching it with a fake, but used a Kevlar vest to protect Mohinder from Samuel's attack, so he only seemed dead.  He said that he knew as he accidentally time traveled ten minutes too far the first time and what he found "wasn't pretty."  Thanks to Hiro's actions, Samuel did believe that Mohinder was dead.  Later, Hiro trapped Mohinder in a mental institution so that he won't go after Samuel.  In the present time, Hiro and Ando eventually rescue him from there, though he isn't happy with what Hiro did to him.

Spiritual life 

The Heroes graphic novel "Monsters" shows that throughout his life, Mohinder has identified both as Hindu like his mother and atheist like his father. When he heard that his father, Chandra Suresh, had died, he wondered if perhaps the goddess Kali had punished him for his lack of faith. During Chandra's ashes immersion at Kanyakumari, however, he was fluently chanting Sanskrit Upanishadic verses as prescribed by ritual. Prior to curing the Haitian, he says he has trouble believing in any God who would let the superhuman virus wreak havoc; however, it was unclear if he actually believed this view or not.

References

External links 
 Dr. Suresh's Research Website

Fictional characters with superhuman strength
Fictional professors
Fictional parapsychologists
Fictional geneticists
Fictional mad scientists
Fictional scientists in television
Fictional taxi drivers
Heroes (American TV series) characters
Fictional Indian people
Television characters introduced in 2006
Male characters in television

pl:Postacie z serialu Herosi#Mohinder Suresh